Alfonso Jessel (born 16 May 1958) is a Mexican wrestler. He competed in the men's freestyle 74 kg at the 1988 Summer Olympics.

References

External links
 

1958 births
Living people
Mexican male sport wrestlers
Olympic wrestlers of Mexico
Wrestlers at the 1988 Summer Olympics
Place of birth missing (living people)